is the name of a country or location that appears in the book of Sui as being in the region of Wa.

Outline 
The  appears in the book of Sui in " Japanese missions to Sui China brought by Japanese envoys to the Sui Dynasty (俀国) sent by king  to Emperor Yang of Sui. Mainly in the western part of the Chugoku region.

References

See also 

 Toyo Province
 Hata clan
 
 Chikushikoku
Former countries in Japanese history
History of the Kyushu region
Wajinden
Pages with unreviewed translations
States of the Wajinden